Epic Records Japan is a Japanese record label owned by Sony Music Entertainment Japan. Its founder was Shigeo Maruyama.

Between 1978 and 1988 the label operated as a wholly owned subsidiary: Epic/Sony Inc. was established in August 1978 and was folded back into CBS/Sony Group in March 1988.

Notable music artists for this company have included Motoharu Sano, Tetsuya Komuro, and Kimiko Itoh.

Games published 
During the late 1980s and early 1990s they also published video games for Nintendo consoles.
 1987 - Tokoro-san no Mamoru mo Semeru mo for Famicom – developed by HAL Laboratory
 1988 - Vegas Dream for Famicom
 1989 -  Flying Hero for Famicom – developed by Aicom
 1989 - Tashiro Masashi no Princess ga Ippai for Famicom 
 1990 - サッカー・ボーイ Soccer Boy = Soccer Mania for Game Boy
 1990 - Solstice for Famicom – developed by Software Creations (UK)
 1991 - RoboCop for Game Boy
 1991 - Hakunetsu Pro Yakyuu Ganba League = Extra Innings for Famicom – developed by Sting
 1991 - Jerry Ball = Smart Ball for Super Famicom
 1991 - Dragon's Lair for Famicom – developed by Motivetime
 1991 - Dragon's Lair for Game Boy – developed by Motivetime
 1991 - Altered Space for Game Boy 
 1991 - Hudson Hawk for Famicom
 1992 - Hudson Hawk for Game Boy
 1992 - Robocop2 for Game Boy
 1992 - Hook for Famicom – developed by Ocean
 1992 - Hook for Game Boy – developed by Ocean
 1992 - Hook for Super Famicom – developed by Ukiyotei
 1992 - Ganba League '93  for Famicom – developed by Sting
 1993 -  = Utopia: The Creation of a Nation for Super Famicom 
 1993 - Solstice II = Equinox for Super Famicom – developed by Software Creations
 1993 -  Ganba League '94 1994 -  Karura Ou = Skyblazer'' for Super Famicom – developed by Ukiyotei

Record labels

Active 
 Epic Records Japan

Inactive 
 Antinos
 Dohb Discs
 So What? Records
 Kowalski
 mf Records (joint venture with Motoharu Sano)
 Mint Age

Current artists 

 2PM
 7!!
 Abingdon Boys School
 Akeboshi, Yoshio
 Angela Aki
 Aqua Timez
 Kousuke Atari
 Aura
 Brian the Sun
 Cinemusica
 The Condors
 Daisuke
 Deen
 Dreams Come True
 Dustz
 Hajime, Chitose
 Got7
 Halcali
 Haneyuri
 Ikimono-gakari
 Yuki
 Sawa
 LGMonkees (No Doubt Tracks/Epic)
LMYK
 Lizabet
 Yui Makino
 Nao Matsushita
 Yuya Matsushita
 Yukie Nakama
 Nangi
 Naoto
 NiziU
 No3b
 Nodame Orchestra
 Nothing's Carved in Stone
 Pengin
 Motoharu Sano (Epic/mf)
 Shigi
 Solita
 Stance Punks (Epic/Kowalski/Dynamord)
 Stray Kids
 Sugaru, Matsutani (Epic/Informel)
 Masaki Suda
 Masayuki Suzuki
 Takachiya
 Yutaka Take
 Theatre Brook
 T.M.Revolution
 Uranino
 Hikaru Utada
 Anne Watanabe
 Misato Watanabe
 Yacht

Former artists 
 ViViD
 Crystal Kay

References

External links 
 Official website
 Epic/Sony at Discogs

Sony
Sony Music Entertainment Japan
Epic Records
Mass media companies based in Tokyo
Software companies based in Tokyo
Video game companies of Japan
Japanese record labels
Record labels established in 1978
Record labels disestablished in 1988
Record labels established in 2001
Re-established companies